The following is a list of water parks in Europe sorted by region.

Armenia
 Aquapark Harsnaqar, Sevan
 Aquatek, Yerevan
 Water World, Yerevan

Austria
 Sonnentherme Lutzmannsburg
 H2O Hotel-Therme

Azerbaijan
 AF Hotel Aqua Park, Baku, Azerbaijan
 Dalga Beach, Merdekan

Belarus
 Waterpark Lebyazhij, Minsk

Belgium

 Aquafun SunParks De Haan
 Aquafun SunParks Mol
 Aquafun SunParks Oostduinkerke
 Aqualibi in Wavre
 AquaMundo Center Parcs Erperheide Peer
 AquaMundo Center Parcs De Vossemeren Lommel
 Duinenwater Knokke-Heist
 Molenheide Houthalen-Helchteren
 Plopsaqua De Panne

Bulgaria
 Aqua Paradise Water Park, Nesebar
 Action Aquapark, Sunny Beach
 Kuban Resort and Aquapark
 Aquamania Albena
 Waterland, Ovoshtnik
 Aquapolis, Golden Sands

Croatia
 Istralandia, Brtonigla, Istria County
 Aquacolors,  near Poreč

Cyprus
 Fasouri Watermania, Limassol –  has Europe's biggest wave pool.
 WaterWorld Themed WaterPark, Ayia Napa – one of the world's largest themed water parks and one of the 12 best water parks of the world

Czech Republic
 Aqua Park Špindlerův Mlýn
 Aquacentrum Šutka
 Aquaforum Františkovy Lázně
 Aqualand Moravia
 AquaPalace Praha – located just outside of Prague, it is one of the largest Central European water worlds, full of toboggans, slides, pools and more water attractions
 Aquapark Kladno
 Aquapark Klášterec nad Ohří
 Aquapark Olešná
 Aquapark Olomouc
 Aquapark Uherské Hradiště
 Aquapark Vyškov
 Centrum Babylon Liberec
 Vodní ráj Jihlava
 Vodní svět Sareza
 AquaCentrum Pardubice

Denmark
 Aquapark, in Fårup Summer Park – the largest water park of any amusement park in the country.
 Vandland, in Djurs Sommerland.
 The Lalandia Aquadome, in Billund – Scandinavia's largest water park.
 The Lalandia Aquadome, in Rødby.

Estonia
 Tervise Paradiis in Pärnu 
 H2O Waterpark in Viimsi
 Kalev Spa Hotel in Tallinn
 Aqua Spa in Rakvere
 Noorus Veepark in Narva-Jõesuu
 Aura Waterpark in Tartu

Finland
 Caribia Spa, Turku – a water park/spa, Caribbean style
 Flamingo Spa,  near the Finnish capital Helsinki
 Serena Waterpark,  Espoo, near the Finnish capital Helsinki
 Jukupark Turku
 Jukupark Kalajoki
 Fontanella, Siilinjärvi, near Kuopio

France
 Aqua Boulevard, Paris
 Aqualand – 8 Aqualand water parks exist in France
 Aqualagon, Villeneuve-le-comte (August 2017)
 Aquariaz, Morzine
 Aqualud, Le Touquet-Paris-Plage

Georgia
 Gino Paradise Tbilisi, Tbilisi
 Aqua Park, Batumi
 Aqua Lazika, Anaklia

Germany

 Alpamare, Bad Tölz, Bavaria (near Munich) – one of Europe's first water parks (closed since 2015)
 Aqualand, Cologne, North Rhine-Westphalia
 Kristall Palm Beach, Stein near Nuremberg – famous for its extreme water slides
Rulantica, Rust, Baden-Württemberg 
 SchwabenQuellen, Stuttgart, Baden-Württemberg ("Swabia Fountains") – a member of European Waterparks Association (EWA)
 Therme Erding, Erding, Bavaria, 45 km northeast of Munich – Europe's biggest thermal spa, attracts nearly 1,500,000 visitors per year
 Tropical Islands, Briesen, Brandenburg (near Berlin) – has the largest tropical indoor pool in the world

Greece
 Aqua Creta Limnoupolis Water Park, Crete – Family entertainment with relaxation
 Acqua Plus Water Park, Crete – a member of World Waterpark Association (WWA)
 Aqualand Corfu – the largest water park in Greece and third-largest in Europe
 Lido Waterpark, Kos Island – member of World Waterpark Association
 Watercity in Crete – a member of World Waterpark Association (WWA)
 Splash Waterpark, Isthmos, Corinth
 Aquapolis, Spata, Attiki – owned by Attica Zoological Park
 Waterland WaterPark, Thessaloniki
 Waterpark, Faliraki, Rhodes
 Aquatica waterpark Kos
 Santorini water park
 Onaqua sea sports park
 Waterfun S.A.
 Caretta beach resort & waterpark

Hungary
 Aquapark in spa of Hajduszoboszlo, the largest spa complex in Europe (:hu:Hajdúszoboszlói gyógyfürdő)
 , Mogyoród
 Aquaworld Budapest – one of the largest European year-round water theme parks, in the style of a Cambodian Angkor temple
 Annagora Aquapark Balatonfüred
 Demjén Thermal Spa & Aquapark
 AquaCity Zalaegerszeg
Napfényfürdő Aquapolis Szeged
Debrecen Aquaticum Mediterrán Élményfürdő & water park
Gyulai Várfürdő, Aquapalota
Aqua Island Esztergom
Mórahalmi Szent Erzsébet Gyógyfürdő
Aqua Centrum Csúszdapark Cegléd 
Kecskeméti Élményfürdő és Csúszdapark
Ceglédi Gyógyfürdő és Szabadidőközpont
Harkányfürdő

Ireland
 Aqua Dome water park Tralee, County Kerry
 Aquazone at the National Aquatic Centre, Blanchardstown, Dublin
Clara Lara FunPark, County Wicklow
 Funtasia Waterpark, Drogheda, County Louth
 Splash World, Tramore, Co Waterford
 Baysports, Hodson Bay, Roscommon
 Waterworld, Bundoran, Co. Donegal

Italy
 Acquavillage, Follonica, Livorno
 Aquafan, Riccione, Rimini
 Acquavillage, Cecina, Livorno
 Acquaworld, Concorezzo, Monza e Brianza
 Caneva Acquapark, Lazise, Verona
 Caribe Bay, Jesolo, Venezia
 Etnaland, Belpasso, Catania
 Gardaland waterpark, Milano
 Le Vele Acquapark, San Gervasio Bresciano, Brescia
 Mirabilandia Beach, Savio, Ravenna
 Ondaland, Vicolungo, Novara
 Rainbow Magic Land, Valmontone, Roma
 River Park, Rivergaro
 Sunlight Park, Tirrenia, Pisa
 Zoomarine, Torvaianica, Pomezia

Latvia
 Livu Akvaparks, Jūrmala, near Riga

Lithuania
 Druskininkų Vandens Parkas, Druskininkai
 Vichy Vandens Parkas, Vilnius

Malta
 Splash & Fun Water Park

Montenegro
 Aqua park Mediteran Bečići
 Aqua park Budva

Netherlands

 Aqua Mexicana, Slagharen
 Aquaventura, Hellendoorn
 Dutch Water Dreams, Zoetermeer
 Hof van Saksen, Nooitgedacht
 Splesj, Hoeven
 Tikibad, Wassenaar
 Splash, hellevoetsluis
 WipeOut Zoelen
 Aqua Mundo de Eemhof, Zeewolde
 Aqua Mundo het Heijderbos, Heijen
 Aqua Mundo park Zandvoort, Zandvoort
 Aqua Mundo het Meerdal, America
 Aqua Mundo park Sandur, Emmen
 Aqua Mundo port Zélande, Ouddorp
 Aqua Mundo de Limburgse Peel, America
 Aqua Mundo de Huttenheugte, Dalen
 Aqua Mundo de Kempervennen, Westerhoven

North Macedonia
 Aqua Park Macedonia, Probištip
 Aqua Park Skopje, Skopje

Norway
 Bø Sommarland, Bø, Telemark

Poland

 Aquapark Fala Łodz
 Aquapark Gryfino
 Aquapark Karpacz
 Aquapark Kraków
 Jarosławiec, Aquapark Panorama Morska, Jarosławiec
 Aquapark Polkowice
 Aquapark Reda
 Aquapark Tarnowskie Góry
 Aquapark Wisła
 Aquapark Wrocław
 Aquapark Zakopane
 Aquapark Zielona Góra
 Termy Białka
 Termy Bukowina Tatrzańska
 Termy Maltańskie
 Park Wodny Jan, Darłowo
 Suntago, Wręcza

Portugal
 Aqualand, Alcantarilha
 Aquashow Park Hotel water park, Quarteira
 Slide & Splash, Lagoa
 Zoomarine, Guia
 Norpark, Nazaré
 Sportágua, Peniche
 Aquagruta, Mira de Aire
 Aquafixe, Torre de Moncorvo
 Panorâmico Aquaparque, Pombal
 Parque Aquático Costa do Sol, Caldas das Felgueiras
 Complexo Desportivo Príncipe Perfeito, Cabanões
 Praia Fluvial do Almargem, Almargem
 Parque Aquático de Santarém, Santarém
 Vaga Splash, Gafanha da Boa Hora
 Parque Aquático de Fafe, Fafe
 Parque Aquático de Amarante, Amarante
 Parque Aquático do Crato, Crato
 Clube do Rio, Baixa da Banheira
 Mariparque, Praia da Vieira
 Scorpio, Mascotelos
 NaturWaterPark, Vila Real

Slide & Splash

Slide & Splash is a chain of water parks in Portugal. It opened on June 10, 1986. Seasonal water park with slides, pools and rides plus live falconry, reptile and tropical bird shows.

Transportation
Quarteira / Vilamoura 
Albufeira 
São Rafael / Galé 
Armação de Pêra 
Carvoeiro 
Ferragudo 
Alvor / Praia Rocha / Portimão 
Burgau / Praia da Luz / Lagos 
Sagres / Salema, Portugal 
Sotavento Algarvio, the eastern part of the Algarve region, Portugal, around Faro

Attractions
Corkscrew 
Banzai 
Big Slides
Jacuzzi 
Former Swimming Pool
Children Swimming Pool
Jumps 
Black Hole 
Plunge
Tornado
Kamikaze
the new Big Wave 
Kamikaze 
Foam Slides 
Children Foam Slides 
Kamikaze Renewal 
Crazy River 
River Dive

Romania
 Divertiland, Chiajna, Ilfov county, near Bucharest
 Paradisul Acvatic, Brașov, Brașov county
 Therme, Balotești, Ilfov county, near Bucharest
 Water Park, Otopeni, Ilfov county, near Bucharest

Russia
 Karibia, Perovo District, Moscow
 KVA-KVA Park, Mytishchi, Moscow Oblast
 MOREON, Yasenevo District, Moscow
 Piterland, Saint Petersburg
 Tiki-Tak, Anapa, Krasnodar Krai
 Zolotoj Plyazh, Anapa, Krasnodar Krai
 Zolotaya Bukhta, Gelendzhik, Krasnodar Krai
 H2O, Rostov-on-Don, Rostov Oblast

Serbia
 Aqua Park Izvor, Arandjelovac, in Bukovička Banja spa center
 Aqua Park Jagodina, Jagodina
 Aqua Park Petroland, Bački Petrovac near Novi Sad
 Aqua Park Podina, in Sokobanja spa center

Slovakia

 Aquacity Poprad
 Aquapark Tatralandia
 Aquapark Senec
 GinoParadise Bešeňová
 Spa & Aquapark Turčianske Teplice

Spain

 Aqualand Costa Adeje, Costa Adeje, Tenerife, Canary Islands
 Aqualand Bahía de Cádiz, El Puerto de Santa María, Cádiz
 Aqualand Maspalomas, Maspalomas, Gran Canaria, Canary Islands
 Aqualand El Arenal, El Arenal, Majorca
 Aqualand Torremolinos, Torremolinos, Málaga
 Aqualandia, Benidorm, Alicante
 Aquapark de Cerceda, Cerceda, A Coruña
 Aquopolis Costa Dorada, La Pineda, Tarragona
 Aquopolis Villanueva de la Cañada, Villanueva de la Cañada, Madrid
 Aquopolis Torrevieja, Torrevieja, Alicante
 Aquopolis Sevilla, Sevilla
 Aquopolis Cartaya, Cartaya, Huelva
 Aquopolis Cullera, Cullera, Valencia
 Aqua Natura, Benidorm, Alicante
 Aquarama, Benicàssim, Castellón
 Parque Acuático Mijas, Aquamijas, Fuengirola, Málaga
 Lago Taurito, Mogán, Gran Canaria, Canary Islands
 Aquasierra, Villafranca de Córdoba, Córdoba
 Hidropark, Alcúdia, Majorca
 PortAventura Aquatic Park, Salou, Tarragona
 Siam Park, Tenerife, Canary Islands
 Water World, Lloret de Mar, Girona
 Western Water Park, Magaluf, Majorca
 Aquabadajoz, Badajoz
 Aquavelis, Torre del Mar, Málaga
 Aquatropic, Almuñécar, Granada
 Mariopark, Roquetas de Mar, Almería
 AquaVera Parque Acuático, Vera, Almería
 Aqua Natura, Espiardo, Murcia
 Aqualeon, Albinyana, Tarragona
 Illa Fantasía, Vilassar de Dalt, Barcelona
 Marineland Catalunya, Palafolls, Barcelona
 Aquadiver, Platja d'Aro, Girona
 Aquabrava, Roses, Girona
 Agua Mágica, Sevilla
 Acua Waterpark, Corralejo, Fuerteventura, Canary Islands
 Aquarock, Cala en Bosc, Menorca, Balearic Islands
 Aqua Center, Torre del Ram, Menorca, Balearic Islands
 Parque Warner Beach, San Martín de la Vega, Madrid
 Twisted Waterpark, BH Hotel, Magaluf, Majorca
 Guadalpark, Sevilla

Sweden
 Gustavsvik, Örebro
 Skara Sommarland, Skara
 Sunne vattenland, Sunne
 Kokpunkten water park, Västerås
 Oceana, Liseberg, Gøteborg - Opens in 2024

Switzerland
 Alpamare, Freienbach

Turkey
 TFantasy Kuşadası, Aydın
 Adaland, Kuşadası, Aydın
 Land of Legends, Antalya
 Didim Aquapark, Didim
 Bodrum Aqualand, Bodrum
 Troy Aqua Park, Belek
 Alanya Aqua Park, Alanya
 Waterworld Waterpark, Fethiye
 Nashira Aqua Park, Sorgun
 Aqua Dream Waterpark, Marmaris
 Atlantis Water Park, Marmaris
 Star Aqua Park, Marmaris

Ukraine
 AquaSferra, Donetsk
 Jungle, Kharkiv

United Kingdom

England

 Alton Towers Waterpark, Staffordshire – also known as Cariba Creek, part of the Alton Towers Resort
 Brean Splash, Brean, Somerset – an indoor and outdoor fun pool at Brean Leisure Park
 Calypso Cove at the Barnsley Metrodome, Barnsley, South Yorkshire
 Coral Reef Waterworld, Bracknell, Berkshire
 Sandcastle, Blackpool – an indoor water park with a tropical climate
Alpamare, Scarborough, North Yorkshire – Alpine themed indoor & outdoor water park.
 Splashdown Quaywest in Goodrington, Devon – UK's largest open air water park
 Splashdown, Poole, Dorset
 Water World, Stoke-on-Trent – claims to be the No.1 water park in the UK, with over 400,000 annual visitors 
 The Wave, New Union St, Coventry

Scotland
 The Time Capsule, Coatbridge – has a network of pools, water rides, a whirlpool and an ice rink

Wales
 Blue Lagoon, Pembrokeshire – an indoor water park
 Cardiff International Pool – part of the Cardiff International Sports Village
 LC, Swansea

See also 
List of water parks
List of amusement parks in Europe

References 

Lists of amusement parks
Europe-related lists
Lists of tourist attractions in Europe
Lists of buildings and structures in Europe